Stanton Proverbs (born 6 March 1968) is a Barbadian cricketer. He played in ten first-class and seven List A matches for the Barbados cricket team from 1989 to 2003.

See also
 List of Barbadian representative cricketers

References

External links
 

1968 births
Living people
Barbadian cricketers
Barbados cricketers
Cricketers from Bridgetown